Andrew Walker Lyon (born 18 December 1946) is a former English cricketer.  Lyon was a right-handed batsman who bowled right-arm off break.  He was born in Poole, Dorset.

Cricket career
Lyon made his debut for Buckinghamshire in the 1977 Minor Counties Championship against Hertfordshire. Lyon played Minor counties cricket for Buckinghamshire from 1977 to 1988, which included 110 Minor Counties Championship matches and nine MCCA Knockout Trophy matches. In 1979, he made his List A debut for Buckinghamshire against Suffolk in the Gillette Cup. He played five further List A matches for Buckinghamshire, the last coming against Kent in the 1988 NatWest Trophy. In his six List A matches for the county, he took 5 wickets at an average of 42.80, with best figures of 3 for 71. In 1981, he appeared in a single List A match for Middlesex against the touring Sri Lankans. He took two wickets in the match, those of Anura Ranasinghe and Yohan Goonasekera. His brother, David, played Minor counties and List A cricket for Cambridgeshire.

References

External links
Andrew Lyon at ESPNcricinfo

1946 births
Living people
Buckinghamshire cricketers
Cricketers from Poole
English cricketers
Middlesex cricketers